El ángel de Budapest (Angel of Budapest) is a Spanish 2011 World War II-Holocaust television film based on the book Un español frente al Holocausto ("A Spaniard against the Holocaust") written by journalist and radio executive director Diego Carcedo. The executive producers are José Manuel Lorenzo, Eduardo Campoy and István Major, the first two had collaborated on the spiritual film Sin noticias de Dios (2001). The film was shot between 9 November 2010 and 23 December 2010 in Budapest, Hungary.

Plot
The plot focuses on Ángel Sanz Briz, a Spanish ambassador in Hungary during World War II. Operating until early 1944 in Budapest, he helped to save the lives of thousands of Jews from the Holocaust. He issued them protective papers and lodged them in Spanish safe houses, covered by the embassy's sovereignty. At that time, the Hungarian government was persecuting and deporting Jews to Nazi death camps.

A romantic storyline follows the lovelife of Antal, a Hungarian Jew who falls in love with the daughter of an Arrow Cross official of the Fascist government. Antal slowly turns to the resistance movement to save the couple.

Cast
 Anna Allen as Adela Quijano
 Tamás Lengyel as Lajos
 George Mendel as Danielson
 Manuel de Blas as Miguel Ángel Muguiro
 Ana Fernández as Sra. Tourné
 Francis Lorenzo as Ángel Sanz Briz
 Aldo Sebastianelli as Giorgio Perlasca
Tamás Szabó Kimmel as Antal
 Iván Fenyő as Raoul Wallenberg
 Áron Őze as Adolf Eichmann
 László Agárdi as Miklós Horthy
Kata Gáspár
Sára Herrer
Athina Papadimitriu
Tamás Balikó
János Bán
László Baranyi
László Áron

Nominations
 Nominated - Magnolia Award for Best Television Film or Miniseries, 18th Shanghai Television Festival (2012)

References

External links

Spanish war drama films
Holocaust films
Spanish World War II films
2011 television films
2011 films
Historical television series
Films shot in Budapest
Films set in Hungary
Cultural depictions of Raoul Wallenberg
Cultural depictions of Adolf Eichmann
RTVE shows